El Chorro, previously known as General Mosconi until 1 January 2016, is a village and the capital of the Ramón Lista Department of Formosa Province, Argentina. It connects with the RP 39 to the Paraje Bolsa de Palomo.

References 

Populated places in Formosa Province